Prechistoye is an urban locality (a work settlement) and the administrative center of Pervomaysky District of Yaroslavl Oblast, Russia. Population:

History
In the village there is the Uspensky Cathedral, built in 1798-1801 by the means of parishioners. There is a museum of local lore and woods, located in the former shop of merchant Sveshnikov. The People's Theater operates and was founded in 1918.

Notable people
Aleksandr Petrov (animator)

References

Urban-type settlements in Yaroslavl Oblast